Rose mallow may refer to:

Abelmoschus moschatus, native to Asia and Australia
Any plant in the genus Lavatera, especially Lavatera trimestris
Any of several species in the genus Hibiscus, especially:
Hibiscus grandiflorus
Hibiscus lasiocarpos
Hibiscus moscheutos
Hibiscus syriacus

See also
 Mallow (disambiguation)